Aberdeen Central may refer to:

 Aberdeen Central (UK Parliament constituency)
 Aberdeen Central (Scottish Parliament constituency)
 Central High School (Aberdeen, South Dakota)

See also 
 Aberdeen (disambiguation)